Hetty Goldman (December 19, 1881 – May 4, 1972) was an American archaeologist. She was the first woman faculty member at the Institute for Advanced Study and one of the first female archaeologists to undertake excavations in Greece and the Middle East.

Biography
Hetty Goldman was born on December 19, 1881, in New York City. She was a member of the Goldman–Sachs banking family. Her father was Julius Goldman, a lawyer, her mother was Sarah (Adler) Goldman, a homemaker.

Goldman graduated in 1903 from Bryn Mawr College, where she took a double major in English and Greek. She went on to study archaeology at Radcliffe College, where she was the first woman to hold the Charles Eliot Norton Fellowship from Harvard in order to study at the American School of Classical Studies at Athens. She received her PhD in 1916, having written a thesis entitled The Terracottas from the Necropolis of Halae.

Goldman was the first woman to be appointed to the Institute for Advanced Study in 1936. She retired in 1947.

Goldman was elected a Fellow of the American Academy of Arts and Sciences in 1950. In 1966, the Archaeological Institute of America awarded her the Gold Medal Award for Distinguished Archaeological Achievement.

Goldman died May 4, 1972, in Princeton, New Jersey.

See also 
 Mary Hamilton Swindler

References

Further reading

External links
 
Biography at the Institute for Advanced Study
Pottery from the Tarsus Excavations, Bryn Mawr College Art and Artifact Collections
Illustrations from the Tarsus Excavations, Bryn Mawr College Art and Artifact Collections

1881 births
1972 deaths
19th-century archaeologists
20th-century American archaeologists
American people of German-Jewish descent
Jewish American writers
Bryn Mawr College alumni
Fellows of the American Academy of Arts and Sciences
Institute for Advanced Study faculty
Scientists from New York City
Radcliffe College alumni
American women archaeologists
20th-century women writers
19th-century women writers
20th-century American women
Historians from New York (state)